Maciej Grzegorz Szymański (born 25 January 1957, Milicz) is a Polish slavist and diplomat, an ambassador to Slovenia (1998–2002), Serbia (2005–2009), Croatia (2013–2017), and Bulgaria (since 2019).

Life 

Szymański grew up in Międzyrzec Podlaski, and finished high school in Wrocław. In 1981, he graduated from Yugoslav studies at the University of Silesia in Katowice, specialising in Macedonian and Serbo-Croatian languages.

In 1982, he began his professional career at the Ossolineum library in Wrocław. Between 1984 and 1992, he worked as a scientist at the Slavic Institute of the Polish Academy of Sciences. He obtained his Ph.D. thesis on Slavic linguistics there.

In 1992, Szymański joined the Ministry of Foreign Affairs. He began as a head of the unit at the Consular Department. In 1995, he became deputy director there. In 1998, he was director of the Department of Central and South-Eastern Europe. That year he was nominated ambassador to Slovenia, next year being accredited also to newly formed embassy in Sarajevo, Bosnia and Herzegovina. In 2002, he returned to the Consular Department, as a head of unit, and then as a director. Between 2005 and 2009, he was ambassador to Serbia and Montenegro, and since 2006, after the dissolution, to Serbia. Back at the Ministry, he was serving as a director of the Department for Cooperation with Polish Diaspora and Poles Abroad.

In January 2013, Szymański started his mission as an ambassador to Croatia, ending his term in July 2017. Next, for a year, he has been director of the Diplomatic Academy. From February to October 2018, he was the Director General of the Foreign Service. In April 2019, he was nominated ambassador to Bulgaria.

Szymański is married, with four children. In his free time, he photographs nature, birds mostly. His works have been publishing in books, atlases, and magazines, including National Geographic.

Honours 

 Knight of the Order of Polonia Restituta, Poland, 2011
 Knight of the Order of Duke Branimir, Croatia, 2017

References 

1957 births
Ambassadors of Poland to Bosnia and Herzegovina
Ambassadors of Poland to Bulgaria
Ambassadors of Poland to Croatia
Ambassadors of Poland to Serbia
Ambassadors of Poland to Slovenia
Knights of the Order of Polonia Restituta
Living people
Polish philologists
Photographers from Wrocław
Slavists
University of Silesia in Katowice alumni